Brinzolamide (trade names Azopt, Alcon Laboratories, Befardin, Fardi Medicals) is a carbonic anhydrase inhibitor used to lower intraocular pressure in patients with open-angle glaucoma or ocular hypertension.

Brinzolamide was approved as a generic medication in the United States in November 2020.

Chemistry 
Brinzolamide is a carbonic anhydrase inhibitor (specifically, carbonic anhydrase II). Carbonic anhydrase is found primarily in erythrocytes (but also in other tissues including the eye). It exists as a number of isoenzymes, the most active of which is carbonic anhydrase II (CA-II).

Indications 
Use for the treatment of open-angle glaucoma and raised intraocular pressure due to either excess aqueous humor production or inadequate drainage of the humor via the trabecular meshwork.

Pharmacodynamics 
Inhibition of carbonic anhydrase in the ciliary processes of the eye decreases aqueous humor secretion and thus lowers the intraocular pressure in the anterior chamber, presumably by reducing the rate of formation of bicarbonate ions with subsequent reduction in sodium and fluid transport; this may alleviate the effects of open-angle glaucoma.

Pharmacokinetics

Absorption 
The recommended frequency for topical application is two times per day. Following ocular instillation, the suspension is systemically absorbed to some degree; however the plasma concentrations are low and generally below the limits of detection (less than 10 ng/mL) due to extensive binding by tissues and erythrocytes. Oral administration is less-favored due to variable absorption from the stomach mucosa and an increased side-effect profile versus ophthalmic administration.

Distribution 
The compound is fairly well protein-bound (60%), but adheres extensively to the carbonic anhydrase-containing erythrocytes. Due to the abundance of readily-bound erythrocytes and minimal known metabolism, Brinzolamide's whole blood half-life is very long (111 days).

Metabolism 
While definitive sites of metabolism have not been firmly established, there are several metabolites worthy of note. N-Desethylbrinzolamide is an active metabolite of the parent compound, and thus exhibits carbonic anhydrase inhibitory activity (largely carbonic anhydrase-I, when in the presence of Brinzolamide) and also accumulates in the erythrocytes. However, Brinzolamide's other known metabolites (N-Desmethoxypropylbrinzolamide and O-Desmethylbrinzolamide) either have no activity or their activity is currently unknown.

Excretion 
Brinzolamide is excreted primarily unchanged (60%) in the urine, although the renal clearance rate has not been definitively determined. N-Desethylbrinzolamide is also found in the urine along with lower concentrations of the inactive metabolites, N-Desmethoxypropylbrinzolamide and O-Desmethylbrinzolamide; exact levels have not been definitively determined.

Cautions

Side effects 
Common, but mild: blurred vision; bitter, sour, or unusual taste; itching, pain, watering, or dryness of the eyes; feeling that something is in the eye; headache; runny nose
Rare, but serious: fast or irregular heartbeat; fainting; skin rash, hives, or itching; severe eye irritation, redness, or swelling; swelling in the face, lips, or throat; wheezing or trouble breathing

Precautions 
Hypersensitivity to other sulfonamides
Acute angle-closure glaucoma
Concomitant administration of oral carbonic anhydrase inhibitors
Moderate-to-severe chronic kidney disease or liver disease

Combinations

With timolol 
The combination of brinzolamide with timolol is marketed under the trade name Azarga. This combination may be more effective than either medication alone.

With brimonidine 
The combination of brinzolamide with brimonidine is marketed under the trade name Simbrinza. This combination may be more effective than either medication alone.

References

Further reading

External links 
 

Alcon brands
Amines
Carbonic anhydrase inhibitors
Ethers
Novartis brands
Ophthalmology drugs
Sultams
Sulfones
Thienothiazines